Sunkara is an Indian surname.  Specific people with this name include
 Bhaskar Sunkara, an American socialist writer and publisher.
 Sunkara Balaparameswara Rao, a neurosurgeon.
 Sunkara Venkata Adinarayana Rao, born 1939, Indian orthopaedic surgeon.